Bridget Jones's Baby: Original Motion Picture Soundtrack is the official soundtrack to the 2016 British romantic comedy film, directed by Sharon Maguire. It was released on 16 September 2016 by Universal Music Group.

Track listing

Charts

Certifications

References

2016 soundtrack albums
Albums produced by Ilya Salmanzadeh
Bridget Jones
Comedy film soundtracks
Romance film soundtracks